Ergün Teber (born 9 September 1985 in Adana, Turkey) is a Turkish football who currently plays for Kardemir Karabükspor as a left back.

References

External links
 Gençlerbirliği Site Profile
 Profile at TFF.org
 

1985 births
Living people
Turkish footballers
Turkey youth international footballers
Turkey under-21 international footballers
Süper Lig players
Gençlerbirliği S.K. footballers
Çaykur Rizespor footballers
Sakaryaspor footballers
Kayserispor footballers
Kasımpaşa S.K. footballers
Kayseri Erciyesspor footballers
Kocaelispor footballers
Antalyaspor footballers
Konyaspor footballers
Eskişehirspor footballers
Kardemir Karabükspor footballers
Sportspeople from Adana

Association football defenders